Fabrice A Giger (born 7 January 1965 in Geneva, Switzerland) is a literary publisher and film & TV producer. The son of Swiss painter José Giger, he is well known for publishing thousands of comic books / graphic novels from such authors as Alejandro Jodorowsky, Mœbius, Enki Bilal and John Cassaday.

In 1988, at the age of 23, Giger took over the Paris-based publishing house Les Humanoïdes Associés (also known as Humanos in colloquial French and as Humanoids in English), its catalog, and brands such as Métal Hurlant (from which the American magazine Heavy Metal was adapted). In the same year, he founded his own  publishing house, specializing in the publication of more traditional bandes dessinées aimed at a younger readership. Giger would terminate Alpen in 1994 after unsuccessful efforts to integrate its disparate catalogue into that of Humanoïdes, instead focusing on the latter. In less than a decade, he turned it into a multimedia group, involved not only in comic book publishing, but also in CGI animation, digital effects, internet content and software development.

In 1995, he co-founded the CGI animation studio, Sparx*, with branches in France and Vietnam, and the production company Sparkling which went on to produce shows such as Rolie Polie Olie for which Giger won an Emmy Award in 2000 as executive producer.

In 1998, in Los Angeles, he founded Humanoids, Inc., the American counterpart of Les Humanoïdes Associés.

In the years 1999-2000, he partnered with directors Ridley Scott, Tony Scott and Renny Harlin to launch a website featuring original content based on Humanoids titles. The catalog has been a constant source of inspiration for filmmakers and the movie industry in general since the seventies and thus Giger sought to create a digital content platform to combine the talents from these different mediums. Despite producing hours of material, the site never took off due to the unfortunate timing of the bursting of the Internet bubble.

While having developed and published dozens of new titles every year in various genres since his inception of the company, with most of them having been translated into numerous languages, Giger re-launched the anthology Métal Hurlant for a 14-issue run between 2002 and 2004, that was published around the world. A good portion of the original content they created for the occasion was later adapted for television with the TV series Métal Hurlant Chronicles, that Giger exec-produced and which aired in October 2012.

At the end of 2004, Giger stepped down from all his duties and took a sabbatical of several years, including one spent in Pondicherry, India, near the Sri Aurobindo Ashram.

In 2008, he was called back to France for the restructuring of Les Humanoïdes Associés, and resumed his career as the group's CEO and publisher, which subsequently, in 2010, included a successful reboot of the publishing activities in the English language.

Following the increasing presence of Humanoids titles in Asia (the best-selling Sci-Fi graphic novel ever, The Incal, is still the record holder for having the highest sales of a non-Japanese graphic novel in Japan), including China, and in the European markets, Giger announced at the New York Comic Con on 5 October 2018 a major foray into the American comic book industry with the creation of a new line of content and a shared universe under the name of H1. In the same move, the company announced the hiring of two top, Eisner Award-winning US creators: John Cassaday, as Humanoids’ Chief Creative Officer; and Mark Waid as its Director of Creative Development.

References

1965 births
Emmy Award winners
Comic book publishers (people)
Living people
Swiss television producers